The 1912 season of Úrvalsdeild was the first season of league football in Iceland. KR won the first ever title. No teams were relegated as there were only three registered at that time. ÍBV Vestmannaeyjar withdrew after 1 match.

League standings

Results

Playoff

References

Úrvalsdeild karla (football) seasons
Iceland
Iceland
Urvalsdeild